Yana Aleksandrovna Troyanova (born 12 February 1973) is a Russian theater and film actress, director. Her film credits include Zhit, Volchok and Kokoko. She directed the short film Ryadom.

Biography
Yana Mokritskaya was born in posyolok Lechebnyy Sverdlovsk Oblast. Before studying at the Ekaterinburg Theatre Institute in the Anisimova studio, she studied at the Faculty of Philosophy of the Ural State University.

She is married to the playwright and film director Vassily Sigarev.

In 2009, Kinotavr won the prize for Best Actress in the film Sigareva Volchok. In addition, it was nominated for the award "White Elephant" and Asia Pacific Screen Awards.

Troyanova made her directorial debut in 2014. At the film festival "Kinotavr" Short participated in the competition of her film Ryadom.

Filmography

See also
 Asia Pacific Screen Award for Best Performance by an Actress
 Prize-winners of "Kinotavr"

References and notes

External links

 
 

1973 births
Living people
Actors from Yekaterinburg
Russian film actresses
Russian television actresses
Russian stage actresses
21st-century Russian actresses